Dakra is a census town in Balurghat CD Block in Balurghat subdivision of Dakshin Dinajpur district in the state of West Bengal, India.

Geography

Location

Dakra is located across the Atreyee opposite Balurghat.

In the map alongside, all places marked on the map are linked in the full-screen version.

Demographics
As per the 2011 Census of India, Dakra had a total population of 5,268, of which 2,643 (50%) were males and 2,625 (50%) were females. Population below 6 years was 407. The total number of literates in Dakra was 4,224 (86.90% of the population over 6 years).

References

 Cities and towns in Dakshin Dinajpur district